Virotutis is a Celtic epithet of the god Apollo. The epithet has been interpreted as meaning "Benefactor of humanity". Apollo Virotutis was worshipped at, among other places, Fins d'Annecy (Haute-Savoie) and at Jublains (Maine-et-Loire).

References
 Dictionary of Celtic Myth and Legend. Miranda Green. Thames and Hudson Ltd. London. 1997

Gaulish gods
Epithets of Apollo